Himalistra is a genus of moths of the family Noctuidae.

Species
 Himalistra arcessita Hacker & Ronkay, 1992
 Himalistra aristata Hreblay, Plante & Ronkay, 1995
 Himalistra caesia Hreblay, Plante & Ronkay, 1994
 Himalistra eriophora (Püngeler, 1901)
 Himalistra extera Hacker & Ronkay, 1992
 Himalistra fusca Hacker & Ronkay, 1992
 Himalistra hackeri Hreblay, Plante & Ronkay, 1995
 Himalistra nekrasovi Hacker & Ronkay, 1992
 Himalistra nivea Hreblay, Plante & Ronkay, 1994
 Himalistra obscura Hreblay, Plante & Ronkay, 1995
 Himalistra rubida Hreblay, Plante & Ronkay, 1995
 Himalistra tahiricola Ronkay & Hreblay, 1994
 Himalistra variabilis Hreblay, Plante & Ronkay, 1995

References
Natural History Museum Lepidoptera genus database
Himalistra at funet

Cuculliinae